The 1980–81 Cypriot Second Division was the 26th season of the Cypriot second-level football league.  Evagoras Paphos won their 3rd title.

Format
Fourteen teams participated in the 1980–81 Cypriot Second Division. All teams played against each other twice, once at their home and once away. The team with the most points at the end of the season crowned champions. The first two teams were promoted to 1981–82 Cypriot First Division. The last two teams were relegated to the 1981–82 Cypriot Third Division.

Changes from previous season
Teams promoted to 1980–81 Cypriot First Division
 Nea Salamis Famagusta FC

Teams relegated from 1979–80 Cypriot First Division
 APOP Paphos FC
 Evagoras Paphos

Teams promoted from 1979–80 Cypriot Third Division
 Iraklis Gerolakkou

Teams relegated to 1980–81 Cypriot Third Division
 ASIL Lysi
 Ethnikos Assia FC

League standings

See also
 Cypriot Second Division
 1980–81 Cypriot First Division
 1980–81 Cypriot Cup

References

Cypriot Second Division seasons
Cyprus
1980–81 in Cypriot football